Hambletonian, was one of the best Thoroughbred racehorses of the late 18th century, having won all of his race starts, except one, and was later a good sire. His victories included two Doncaster Cups in the late 1790s and the St. Leger Stakes at Doncaster in 1795.

Background
Hambletonian was a bay colt that was bred by John Hutchinson and foaled in 1792. Hambletonian was by the useful sire, King Fergus and was a grandson of the two undefeated horses, Eclipse and Highflyer, who was the sire of his dam Grey Highflyer.

Racing record
Hambletonian was named after the historic racing area of Hambleton Hills, which is on the edge of the North York Moors, at the top of Sutton Bank. On 14 May 1794 Hambletonian won his first race there, "A sweepstake of 15 guineas each for three-year-old colts, 8 stone (51 kg), fillies 7 st. 11 lb. (49.5 kg) run over two miles"

In August 1795, Sir Charles Turner at the York races, purchased Hambletonian, Beninghbrough (also by King Fergus) and Oberon from Hutchinson for 3,000 guineas. At the same meeting Hambletonian won two sweepstakes and on 22 September at the Doncaster meeting he won the St. Leger Stakes. The next day Hambletonian won his first Doncaster Cup and Beningbrough was victorious in the Doncaster Stakes. 
  
In 1796 at York Hambletonian lost his only race to The Derby winner, Spread Eagle, after running off the course. At the same meeting he won back £50 from Spread Eagle and two others. Later that year Hambletonian was sold to Sir Henry Vane-Tempest of nearby Wynyard Park, County Durham, for whom he raced until 1800. At the York August meeting he won both the five-year-old and the six-year-old and over Subscription Purses.

Hambletonian did not start during 1798. In a famous match with Mr. Cookson's Diamond over the four-mile Beacon Course at Newmarket on 25 March 1799, Hambletonian, ridden by Francis Buckle, won by a neck in a time of 7 minutes 15 seconds. He is said to have covered 21 feet in a single stride at the finish.  Sir Henry had wagered 3,000 guineas on the outcome.  The horse was afterwards the subject of the painting, Hambletonian Rubbing Down by the great equine artist, George Stubbs, who was then 75 years old. In 1800 Hambletonian won his only start in the Great Subscription Purse for six-year-olds and over at York.

Stud record
Hambletonian retired to stud in 1801 standing at Seacroft-Hall, near Leeds, then from 1802 to 1808 he stood at Hornsey's stables in Middlethorpe, York for a fee of 10 guineas per mare. In the 1809 season he was at Wynyard, near Stockton-on-Tees, in 1810 and 1811 he returned to Middlethorpe, with his fee rising to 20 and 25 guineas, 1812 and 1813 at Wynyard and finally at Catterick, near Richmond, in 1814, the last year he was advertised, his fee had declined to 15 guineas.

His most notable progeny included:
 Anticipation, won sixteen races, including the Ascot Gold Cup, twice; got excellent hunters
 Camerton, won Goodwood Cup, exported to France in 1818
 Camillus, won Doncaster Cup, successful sire
 Fair Helen (gr f 1808), second dam of the stallion and St Leger winner Margrave 
 Goosander, dam of the Epsom Derby winner Sailor and the Oaks Stakes winner Shoveler and taproot mare of Family 6-c
 Lisette, dam of 2,000 Guineas winner Clearwell and a foundation mare of Family 19-b. 
 Whitelock, continued the sire line through Blacklock and on to the undefeated St. Simon.

Hambletonian died 28 March 1818 and is buried in the grounds of Sir Henry's former home, Wynyard Park, County Durham.

See also 

List of leading Thoroughbred racehorses
Hambletonian 10, 1849–1876, a foundation sire of the harness racing breed known as the Standardbred.

References

1792 racehorse births
1818 racehorse deaths
Racehorses bred in the Kingdom of Great Britain
Racehorses trained in the Kingdom of Great Britain
Thoroughbred family 1
St Leger winners